The Abu Dhabi Motor Show is a biennial show held in Abu Dhabi, United Arab Emirates. It is organized by Reed Exhibitions, and sponsored by companies like Al Hilal Bank and Yas Marina Circuit, in association with Emirates Auction and the Ministry of Interior Abu Dhabi.
With over 42 exhibitors and 50,000 attendees from all over the world in 2010, and an approximately 93% good to excellent rating from exhibitors in 2008, the Motor Show is expanding by every year due to a reported increase in the number of exhibitors, as well as attendees by the year.

The show is well known for its display of latest car models from Ferrari, Lamborghini, Hummer, Mercedes, Lexus and many well named global companies in the auto-industry, but more for the new product launches by these firms. The show attracts mass crowds from the surrounding countries of the Arab world who bring in some of their very own customized and high-tech cars. Most luxury car auctions exceed their expectations in price due to the increased competition coming in every year.  

In recent years, the show has attracted mass audiences primarily due to its close relation with the Abu Dhabi Formula 1 races, which drives over 10 thousand visitors into Abu Dhabi each year during a time very close to the Motor Show. The event takes place at the Abu Dhabi National Exhibition Centre (ADNEC), during the early few weeks of December. This also provided most automotive the benefits of marketing their products to a larger audience as most attended tend to make the best of their trip by exploring different aspects of the car industry, from races to new car models to price changes in vehicles. The 2012 show is predicted to be even bigger, both exhibitor and visitor wise.

Cars Presented at the 2010 Show 
Toyota FJ Cruiser
Chevrolet Camaro
Ferrari 458 Italia
Ford Expedition
Ferrari California
Hyundai Genesis
GMC Acadia Denali
Hyundai Accent
KIA Optima
Toyota Land Cruiser
Lexus GS460
Ford Mustang
Lamborghini Gallardo
Toyota Zelas

The Venue 
Abu Dhabi National Exhibition Centre has been one of the key areas of the city of Abu Dhabi where most local and international events take place, from exhibitions to university presentations. The ADNEC complex consists of the exhibition centre with 12 halls, 3 food outlets and a few kiosks to cater to the moving crowd. 
Prior to ADNEC, the Motor Show took place in an older expo centre not far from the new, more modern-looking ADNEC. Coming to this new location has attracted mass crowds from all over the world, with people from very different trades.

Trade fairs in the United Arab Emirates

Auto shows in the United Arab Emirates
Events in Abu Dhabi